Edmond is a given name. It may also refer to:

Places
 Edmond, Kansas
 Edmond, Oklahoma
 Edmonds, Washington
 Edmond, West Virginia

Arts and entertainment
 Edmond (play), a 1982 play by David Mamet
 Edmond (film), a 2005 film based on the 1982 play
 E.d.M.O.N.D, a 2013 EP by Edmond Leung
 Edmond, a 2016 play by Alexis Michalik
 Edmond, a 2019 film adaptation of the play, written and directed by Michalik

Other
 Edmond (1833), a passenger sailing ship that sank off the coast of Ireland in 1850
 Edmond, a racehorse that was the joint favourite for the 2001 Grand National

See also
Edmund (disambiguation)
Edward (disambiguation)